Oleh Petrovych Bazylevych (also: Bazilevich, Bazylewicz; 6 July 1938 – 16 October 2018) was a Ukrainian footballer, football (soccer) coach, and sport administrator. He holds titles of the Master of Sports of the USSR, Merited Coach of the Soviet Union, and Merited Coach of Ukraine.

Career
Bazylevych played club football for Dynamo Kyiv, Chornomorets Odessa and Shakhtar Donetsk, winning the Soviet Top League with Dynamo Kyiv in 1961 and the USSR cup in 1964. Bazylevych played for Dynamo Kyiv from 1957 to 1965 in 161 matches and scored 53 goals.

This player was noted for his high speed, technique of ball possession and excellent play in the air. He is remembered for often locking himself in the far post of Valery Lobanovsky. The Bazylevych-Lobanovsky duo scored 11 of the team's 29 goals in the 1966 tournament.

Following his playing career, Bazylevych became a manager. As a co-manager with Valeriy Lobanovskyi Bazylevych won with Dynamo Kyiv the 1974–75 Cup Winners' Cup and the 1975 European Super Cup (and a bronze medal with the Soviet Union Olympic football team at the 1976 Summer Olympics).

Bazylevych was fired from the position of the head coach of the Ukraine main team in 1994 when his team managed to lose at home to Lithuania 0:2 in its first game of official competitions. From 1998 to 2001 lead the FFU Committee that worked with national teams.

Awards
 Champion USSR: 1961 (player), 1974, 1975 (coach)
 Silver medals of USSR Championship: 1960, 1965 (player)
 Soviet Cup: 1964 (player), 1974 (coach)
 Cup Winners' Cup: 1975 (coach)
 UEFA Super Cup: 1975 (coach)
 Olympics bronze medal: 1976 (coach)

Death
In January 2017, there were reports of Bazilevich's incurable Parkinson's disease, with which Oleh fought for many years.

On 16 October 2018, Oleh Bazylevych died in Kyiv. He was buried in the Central Avenue of the Baikove Cemetery.

References

External links
 Career overview at FFU official web-site 

1938 births
2018 deaths
Footballers from Kyiv
Association football forwards
Ukrainian footballers
FC Dynamo Kyiv players
FC Chornomorets Odesa players
FC Shakhtar Donetsk players
Soviet Top League players
Soviet footballers
Soviet football managers
Soviet expatriate football managers
Ukrainian football managers
FC Desna Chernihiv managers
FC Shakhtar Donetsk managers
FC Dynamo Kyiv managers
FC Dinamo Minsk managers
Pakhtakor Tashkent FK managers
PFC CSKA Moscow managers
FC Zorya Luhansk managers
Ukraine national football team managers
Ukrainian expatriate football managers
Expatriate football managers in Bulgaria
Expatriate football managers in Kuwait
Merited Coaches of the Soviet Union
Merited Coaches of Ukraine
PFC Slavia Sofia managers
Kuwait SC managers
Deaths from Parkinson's disease
Neurological disease deaths in Ukraine
Burials at Baikove Cemetery
Kuwait Premier League managers